Yeshey Dem is a Bhutanese politician who has been a member of the National Assembly of Bhutan, since October 2018.

Education 
She holds a Bachelor of Arts degree in Language and Literature from Institute of Language and Cultural Studies, Bhutan.

Political career 
Before joining politics, Dem worked as a public relations assistant.

She was elected to the National Assembly of Bhutan as a candidate of DNT from Khamaed Lunana constituency in 2018 Bhutanese National Assembly election. She received 419 votes and defeated Dhendup, a candidate of Druk Phuensum Tshogpa.

References 

1993 births
Living people
Druk Nyamrup Tshogpa politicians
Bhutanese MNAs 2018–2023
Druk Nyamrup Tshogpa MNAs
Bhutanese women in politics